Mooching Through Georgia is the second short subject starring American comedian Buster Keaton made for Columbia Pictures. Keaton made a total of ten films for the studio between 1939 and 1941.

Synopsis
Keaton plays an American Civil War veteran named Homer Cobb, who tells his story of being a Kentucky youth who enlisted in the Confederate Army, but discovered that his brother, Cyrus Cobb (Monte Collins) joined the Union Army. Homer gets captured but Cyrus frees him. Cyrus is captured by the Confederate army but Homer, in turn, frees him. Homer uses all his wits and a few short logs of wood to save his town.

Production
Mooching Through Georgia was Keaton's second film about the American Civil War, his first being The General. The film was later remade in 1946 as Uncivil War Birds starring the Three Stooges (Curly Howard, Moe Howard, and Larry Fine). The song "Dixie" replaces Buster's regular opening theme of "Mary Had a Little Lamb" (later "Three Blind Mice") for this film, and continues as background music for approximately twenty seconds into the opening scene.

External links

Mooching Through Georgia at the International Buster Keaton Society

1939 films
1939 comedy films
Columbia Pictures short films
American black-and-white films
1930s English-language films
Films directed by Del Lord
American Civil War films
Films with screenplays by Buster Keaton
American comedy short films
1930s American films